The National Antarctic Scientific Center (NANC) (abbreviated as НАНЦ) is an organization of the Ukrainian government, part of the Ministry of Education and Science of Ukraine. The Center operates Vernadsky Research Base and coordinates Ukrainian research of Antarctic. Since 2021, it has operated the polar supply and research ship Noosfera.

Goals 
The body's goals are:
 development and implementation of research programs in Antarctica;
 ensuring further development of Vernadsky Research Base;
 interdisciplinary research in the field of environmental protection.

Leaders 
 Petro Hozhyk (1996–1999) 
 Valerii Lytvynov (1999–2018) 
 Yevhen Dykyi since 2018

Links 
 Official website of the National Antarctic Science Center

References

Antarctic expeditions
Science and technology in Ukraine
Scientific organizations based in Ukraine
Ukraine
Government agencies of Ukraine
Scientific organizations established in 1993
Organizations based in Kyiv
Ministry of Education (Ukraine)
Ukraine and the Antarctic